Vincent, François, Paul and the Others is a 1974 French film directed by Claude Sautet based on the novel La grande Marrade by Claude Néron.

Plot 
Three friends face mid-life crises. Paul is a writer who's blocked. François has lost his ideals and practices medicine for the money; his wife grows distant, even hostile. The charming Vincent, everyone's favorite, faces bankruptcy, his mistress leaves him, and his wife, from whom he's separated, wants a divorce.

Cast
 Yves Montand as Vincent
 Michel Piccoli as François
 Serge Reggiani as Paul
 Gérard Depardieu as Jean Lavallee
 Stéphane Audran as Catherine
 Marie Dubois as Lucie
 Umberto Orsini as Jacques
 Ludmila Mikaël as Marie
 Antonella Lualdi as Julia
 Catherine Allégret as Colette 
 Betty Beckers as Myriam
 Yves Gabrielli as Michel
 Jean Capel as Jamain
 Mohamed Galoul as Jo Catano
 Jacques Richard as Armand 
 David Tonelli as Marco 
 Nicolas Vogel as Clovis
 Jean-Denis Robert as Pierre
 Myriam Boyer as Laurence
 Daniel Lecourtois as Georges
 Pierre Maguelon as Farina
 Maurice Auzel as Simon

Reception 
Roger Ebert gave the film 4 out of 4 stars.

References

External links 
 

1974 films
Films directed by Claude Sautet
French drama films
1970s French-language films
Films with screenplays by Jean-Loup Dabadie
Films scored by Philippe Sarde
Midlife crisis films
1970s French films